Senator Bissell may refer to:

Clark Bissell (1782–1857), Connecticut State Senate
William G. Bissell (1857–1925), Wisconsin State Senate